Surgidero de Batabanó, also shortened as Surgidero, is a Cuban village and consejo popular ("people's council", i.e. hamlet) of the municipality of Batabanó, in Mayabeque Province. In 2011 it had a population of about 6,000.

History
The village was officially founded on February 5, 1688.

It is the birthplace of "Nasty" Nestor Cortes Jr.

Geography
Located by the Caribbean Coast, on the Gulf of Batabanó, Surgidero is a coastal village surrounded by a marsh, that lies 3 km south of Batabanó. It is 22 km from Melena del Sur, 24 from Quivicán, 30 from Playa Mayabeque, 32 from Güira de Melena, 37 from Güines, San José de las Lajas and Bejucal, and 54 from Havana city centre.

Transport
The Port of Surgidero, built in the 16th century, is the main port for the communication to Isla de la Juventud (to Nueva Gerona) and Cayo Largo del Sur, with ferryboat and passenger regular services.

The local railway station is the southern terminus of the Havana-Surgidero line, part of the Havana Suburban Railway network. The village is 3 km far from the state highway "Circuito Sur" (CS).

Gallery

See also
Surgidero de Batabanó Lighthouse
Municipalities of Cuba
List of cities in Cuba

References

External links

Surgidero de Batabanó on Lonely Planet
Surgidero de Batabanó Weather on accuweather.com

Populated places in Mayabeque Province
Port cities and towns in Cuba
Populated places established in 1688